The 2009–10 Slovenian Hockey League was the 19th season of the Slovenian Ice Hockey League, the top domestic ice hockey competition in Slovenia. The 2009–10 season was quite different from previous seasons. The new Slohokej League, a multi-national league, in effect replaced the regular part of the Slovenian league, leaving only the playoffs. The playoffs were now opened only open to Slovenian teams, unlike in the past.

The Slovenian teams from the EBEL League and the best teams from the Slohokej League participated in the competition. It was first divided into two groups, and from there moved into the finals.

Teams

From Slohokej

HK Olimpija
Maribor
Mladi Jesenice
Triglav Kranj

From EBEL
HDD Olimpija
Jesenice

Group stage

Group 1

Group 2

Final
Jesenice defeated Olimpija 4–2 in a best of seven series.
Jesenice – Olimpija 8–7 (3–4, 5–1, 0–2)
Jesenice – Olimpija 1–4 (0–1, 0–3, 1–0)
Olimpija – Jesenice 3–2 (0–1, 2–0, 0–1, 1–0) OT 
Olimpija – Jesenice 2–3 (2–1, 0–0, 0–2) 
Jesenice – Olimpija  7–1 (3–1, 3–0, 1–0)
Olimpija – Jesenice 1–2 OT (0–1, 0–0, 1–0, 1–0)

Third place

Maribor defeated Triglav Kranj 2–1 in a best of three series.
Maribor – Triglav Kranj 7–2 (2–0, 2–0, 3–2)
Triglav Kranj – Maribor 6–5 (1–2, 0–1, 4–2, 1–0) OT
Maribor – Triglav Kranj 2–0 (2–0, 0–0, 0–0)

1
Slovenia
Slovenian Ice Hockey League seasons